Clifford Lee Burton (February 10, 1962 – September 27, 1986) was an American musician who was the bassist for thrash metal band Metallica from 1982 until his death in 1986. He performed on the band's first three albums, Kill 'Em All (1983), Ride the Lightning (1984), and Master of Puppets (1986), and appearing on their 4th studio album ...And Justice For All (1988) as a songwriter for the last time.

While touring Europe in support of Master of Puppets in 1986, Burton died in a tour bus accident in Sweden. Regarded as a prominent musical influence, he placed ninth in a 2011 reader poll from Rolling Stone recognizing the greatest bassists of all time. He was posthumously inducted to the Rock and Roll Hall of Fame as a member of Metallica in 2009.

Biography

Early life 
Clifford Lee Burton was born in Castro Valley, California, to Ray and Jan Burton. He had two elder siblings, Scott and Connie. Burton's interest in music began when his father introduced him to classical music and he began taking piano lessons.

In his teenage years, Burton developed an interest in rock, classical, country and eventually heavy metal. He began playing the bass at age 13, after the death of his brother. His parents quoted him as saying, "I'm going to be the best bassist for my brother." He practiced up to six hours per day (even after he joined Metallica). Along with classical and jazz, Burton's other early influences varied from Southern rock and country to the blues.

Burton cited Geddy Lee, Geezer Butler, Stanley Clarke, Lemmy Kilmister, and Phil Lynott as major influences on his style of bass playing.

Career 
While still a student at Castro Valley High School, Burton formed his first band called EZ-Street. The band took its name from a Bay Area topless bar. Other members of EZ-Street included future Faith No More members Jim Martin and Mike Bordin. Burton and Martin continued their musical collaboration after becoming students at Chabot College in Hayward, California. Their second band, Agents of Misfortune, entered the Hayward Area Recreation Department's Battle of the Bands contest in 1981. Their audition was recorded on video and features some of the earliest footage of Burton's playing style. The video also shows Burton playing parts of what would soon be two Metallica songs: his signature bass solo, "(Anesthesia) - Pulling Teeth", and the chromatic intro to "For Whom the Bell Tolls". Burton joined his first professional band, Trauma, in 1982. He recorded the track "Such a Shame" with the band on the second Metal Massacre compilation.

In 1982, Trauma traveled to Los Angeles to perform at the Whisky a Go Go. Among those in attendance were James Hetfield and Lars Ulrich, both members of Metallica, which had formed the previous year. Upon hearing, as Hetfield described it, "this amazing shredding" (parts of which later became "(Anesthesia) - Pulling Teeth"), the two went in search of what they thought was an amazing guitar player. When they learned that what they had heard was a bass solo by Burton, they decided to recruit him for their own band. They asked him to replace departed bassist Ron McGovney, and since Burton thought that Trauma was "starting to get a little commercial", he agreed. The idea of having to move to Los Angeles did not sit well with Burton, who said he would join only if the band relocated from Los Angeles to his native San Francisco Bay Area. Metallica, eager to have Burton in the band, left their origin of Los Angeles to make a home in El Cerrito, a town located across the bay from San Francisco.

Burton's first recording with Metallica was the Megaforce demo. A demo tape the band had made prior to Burton's joining, No Life 'til Leather, managed to come into the hands of Jon Zazula, owner of Megaforce Records. The band relocated to Old Bridge, New Jersey, and quickly secured a recording contract with Zazula's label. Their debut album, Kill 'Em All, features Burton's showcase, "(Anesthesia) - Pulling Teeth", which displayed his use of effect pedals, such as a wah-wah pedal and Electro Harmonix Big Muff, which are ‍not commonly used by ‍bassists.

Metallica's debut album, Kill 'Em All, was originally intended to inherit the name of one of their earlier demo releases (predating Burton's participation), which was Metal Up Your Ass, but the record company did not like the title and insisted on changing it. Burton said "We should just kill 'em all, man," which gave the band members an idea for the new title. The album was released on July 25, 1983, through Megaforce Records.

The band's second studio album, Ride the Lightning, showcased the band's rapidly evolving musical growth. Burton's songwriting abilities were growing, and he received credit on six of the album's eight songs. Burton's playing style and use of effects is notably showcased on two tracks: the chromatic intro to "For Whom the Bell Tolls" (often mistaken as a guitar intro), and the "lead bass" on "The Call of Ktulu".

The band's improving musicianship on Ride the Lightning caught the attention of major record labels. Metallica was signed to Elektra Records, and began working on their third album, Master of Puppets, which is considered by most critics to be a landmark album in heavy metal. Among the tracks featured in the album are the instrumental "Orion" (which features a prominent lead bass section) and the title track, which was Burton's favorite Metallica song. Master of Puppets was the band's commercial breakthrough release, and Burton's final album with Metallica.

Burton's final performance was in Stockholm, Sweden, at the Solnahallen Arena on September 26, 1986, one day before his death. The final song he performed was "Fight Fire With Fire" according to setlist.fm and the cassette included in the deluxe box of Master of Puppets or "Blitzkrieg" according to the band's homepage.

Death 

In Sweden, on the Damage Inc. tour in support of Master of Puppets, the band members complained that the bunks on their tour bus were unsatisfactory and uncomfortable. The story of how Burton won the bunk differs between the two band members, as Kirk Hammett stated on VH1's Behind the Music, he and Burton drew cards, and Burton picked the ace of spades, thereby getting the first choice of bunk. Burton told Hammett "I want your bunk." Hammett replied "Fine, take my bunk, I'll sleep up front, it's probably better anyway." However, Ulrich's version of the event was: Hammett and Burton drew straws, and Burton drew the long straw, winning the choice of bunk. With no safety restraints on the bunks, Burton was thrown violently through the window of the bus, which then fell on top of him, killing him instantly.

The bus driver said that the crash was caused by the bus hitting a patch of black ice on the road, but James Hetfield later stated that he first believed the bus flipped because the driver was drunk. Hetfield also stated that he walked long distances down the road looking for black ice and found none. This was confirmed by police who, like Hetfield, also found no ice on the road. Ljungby detective Arne Pettersson was reported in a local newspaper to have said the tracks at the accident site were exactly like ones seen when drivers fall asleep at the wheel. However, the driver stated under oath that he had slept during the day and was fully rested; his testimony was confirmed by the driver of a second tour bus that was carrying the band's crew and equipment. The driver was determined not at fault for the accident and no charges were brought against him.

Legacy 

Burton's body was cremated and the ashes were scattered at the Maxwell Ranch. At the ceremony, the song "Orion" was played. Shortly after Burton's death, Jason Newsted from Flotsam and Jetsam became Metallica's new bassist.

Metallica wrote a tribute to Burton titled "To Live Is to Die" for ...And Justice for All. Burton also received a writing credit for the lyrics in the middle of the song. A non-Metallica tribute to Burton is the song "In My Darkest Hour" by thrash metal band Megadeth. According to Dave Mustaine, after hearing of Burton's death, he sat down and wrote the music for the song in one sitting. The lyrics, however, are unrelated to Burton's death. Mustaine was Metallica's lead guitarist in the early days and was a close friend of Burton at the time. Thrash metal band Anthrax dedicated its album Among the Living to him, as did Metal Church with The Dark.

On October 3, 2013, a memorial stone was unveiled in Sweden near the scene of the fatal crash. The lyrics "...cannot the Kingdom of Salvation take me home" from "To Live Is to Die" are written on Burton's memorial stone. On April 4, 2009, Burton was posthumously inducted into the Rock and Roll Hall of Fame, with Metallica bandmates James Hetfield, Lars Ulrich, and Kirk Hammett. Subsequent bassists Jason Newsted and Robert Trujillo were inducted as well. During the ceremony, the induction was accepted by his father Ray Burton, who shared the stage with the band and said that Cliff's mother was Metallica's biggest fan.

A biography, To Live Is to Die: The Life and Death of Metallica's Cliff Burton, written by Joel McIver, was published by Jawbone Press in June 2009. Hammett provided the book's foreword. In November 2016, Metallica released the album Hardwired... to Self-Destruct. The deluxe version of the album features a series of live recordings at Berkeley, California's legendary record store Rasputin Music in celebration of Record Store Day on April 16, 2016. The song "Fade to Black" was played with lead singer Hetfield dedicating the song to Burton. During the song Hetfield yells, "Can you hear us Cliff?"

A 2011 reader poll from Rolling Stone placed Burton as the ninth greatest bassist of all time.

In 2017, it was revealed that Burton's parents had been donating his posthumous royalty payments to a scholarship fund for music students at his alma mater Castro Valley High School. In 2018, the Alameda County, California, Board of Supervisors issued a proclamation declaring February 10, 2018, which would have been Burton's 56th birthday, as "Cliff Burton Day" after a fan petition successfully passed. The S&M2 concert in 2019 featured San Francisco Symphony bassist Scott Pingel paying tribute to Burton by playing his signature bass solo, "Anesthesia (Pulling Teeth)", using an electric double bass with pedal effects.

Equipment 

Cliff Burton played a Rickenbacker 4001 bass before joining Metallica. He removed the original pickups from the instrument, replacing the neck pickup with a Gibson EB and the bridge with a Seymour Duncan stacked jazz pickup, among other modifications.

In January 2013, the guitar manufacturer Aria revealed through Metallica's official website that it would be releasing a replica of Burton's bass, called the Aria Pro II Cliff Burton Signature Bass. The company had received permission from Burton's family and from ‍Metallica ‍to produce the instrument. The bass ‍was officially unveiled at Winter ‍NAMM in Anaheim, California. On January 25, 2013, Burton's father Ray ‍attended the press conference where he signed autographs and talked about Burton's life and the instrument. Current Metallica bassist Robert Trujillo was also present and was the first to try out the bass, playing parts of "(Anesthesia) - Pulling Teeth". Ray Burton said, "What a beautiful instrument and a wonderful tribute to Cliff." ‍

Specifications

Headstock: Original SB Design
Neck Shape: Standard, Medium
Neck: 7 Ply Maple/Walnut
Neck Joint: Neck-through, Heel-less Cutaway
Tuners: Handmade Solid Brass Tuner Buttons, 24 K Gold Plated
Nut: 40mm Width Solid Brass
Truss rod Cover: Solid Brass
Headstock Front Inlays: Patent Statement
Headstock Back Inlay: Cliff Burton Authorized Signature
Fretboard Scale: 34" or 864mm
Frets: 24 Frets
Fretboard: Rosewood
Fretboard Inlays: Cat Eye, Mother of Pearl Inlays
Body Shape: Original SB Shape, Super Balanced Body
Body Material: Alder
Pickup: Aria MB-V Passive Pickup
Controls: 1xVolume, 1xTone, 1-Dual Sound Mini-Toggle Switch
Knobs: Black SB Knobs
Tailpiece: Solid Brass With 24K Gold Plated Saddles and Black Plated Body
Strap Pins: 18K Gold Plated Solid Brass
Strings: Rotosound RS66LB (35, 55, 70, 90)
Certificate: Certificate of Authenticity Signed by Ray Burton and Toshi Matsumura
Case: Deluxe Ostrich Hardshell Case With Gold Hardware

Discography 

Studio albums
 Kill 'Em All (1983)
 Ride the Lightning (1984)
 Master of Puppets (1986)
 ...And Justice for All (1988) (posthumous writing credit on "To Live Is to Die")

Video
 Cliff 'em All (1987)

Demos
 No Life 'til Leather (1982) (credited but does not play)
 Megaforce (1983)
 Ride the Lightning (1983)
 Master of Puppets (1985)

Compilations
 Garage Inc. (1998) (featured on "Am I Evil?" and "Blitzkrieg" only)

References

External links 

 
 Cliff In Our Minds – memorial website 
 Metallica.com 

1962 births
1986 deaths
20th-century American bass guitarists
20th-century American pianists
American heavy metal bass guitarists
American male bass guitarists
American male guitarists
American male pianists
Metallica members
Musicians from the San Francisco Bay Area
People from Castro Valley, California
Road incident deaths in Sweden
20th-century American male musicians